Charles Johnston (February 14, 1793 – September 1, 1845) was a U.S. Representative from New York.

Johnston was born in Salisbury, Connecticut, and attended the common schools.  He moved to Poughkeepsie, New York, He studied law, was admitted to the bar and practiced in Poughkeepsie.

Johnston was elected as a Whig to the 26th Congress (March 4, 1839 – March 3, 1841).  He was an unsuccessful candidate for reelection in 1840 to the 27th Congress.

After leaving Congress, Johnston resumed practicing law.

He died in Poughkeepsie on September 1, 1845.  He was originally interred in the burying ground of Christ Episcopal Church.  In 1861 he was reburied at Poughkeepsie Rural Cemetery.

References 

1793 births
1845 deaths
New York (state) lawyers
Burials at Poughkeepsie Rural Cemetery
People from Salisbury, Connecticut
Politicians from Poughkeepsie, New York
Whig Party members of the United States House of Representatives from New York (state)
19th-century American politicians
19th-century American lawyers